Ganjureh (also Romanized as Ganjūreh) is a village in Qaleh Shahin Rural District, in the Central District of Sarpol-e Zahab County, Kermanshah Province, Iran. At the 2006 census, its population was 670, in 147 families.

References 

Populated places in Sarpol-e Zahab County